Summer Crossing is the first novel written by American author Truman Capote. He started the novel in about 1943 and worked on it intermittently for several years before putting it aside. For over 50 years Summer Crossing was thought to be lost but it was eventually rediscovered among Capote's papers and was published in 2005.

The novel tells the story of a spoiled young socialite whose romantic dalliances grow increasingly serious after her parents leave her alone one summer while traveling.

Conception and critical reception
Capote started writing Summer Crossing in 1943 when he was working for The New Yorker.  After taking an evening walk in Monroeville, Alabama, and being inspired to write his first published novel, Other Voices, Other Rooms, he set aside the manuscript .  On August 30, 1949, while vacationing in North Africa, Capote informed his publisher that he was approximately two-thirds through his first draft of Summer Crossing. He optimistically spoke of finalizing the manuscript by the end of the year, even making a vow that he would not return to the United States until he did, but he never submitted more than a first draft to his publisher. Capote had been making minor edits to the work over a period of approximately 10 years. Robert Linscott, Capote's senior editor at Random House, was unimpressed with the first draft. He said he thought it was a good novel, but that it didn't showcase Capote's "distinctive artistic voice." After reading the draft over several times, Capote noted that the novel was "well written and its got a lot of style", but that he just didn't like it.  In particular Capote began "to fear [the novel] was thin, clever, unfelt." Later Capote claimed to have destroyed the unpolished manuscript, along with several other notebooks of prose, as a part of this fit of harsh self-criticism.

Manuscript recovery 
A number of writings including the manuscript to Summer Crossing had been rescued from the trash by the house sitter of an apartment in Brooklyn Heights, where Capote lived around 1950.  Upon the death of the house sitter, his nephew discovered Capote's papers and sent them to Sotheby's for auction in 2004.  The papers failed to sell at auction because of the high price and because the physical papers did not confer publication rights to the work, which were held by the Truman Capote Literary Trust. Subsequently, the New York Public Library reached an agreement to buy the papers and archived them in its permanent Truman Capote Collection.  After a consultation with Capote's lawyer, Summer Crossing was published in 2005. The first edition was set from Capote's original manuscript, which was written in four school notebooks and 62 supplemental notes, with an afterword by Alan U. Schwartz, Capote's executor.

An excerpt of the story was also published in the October 24, 2005, issue of The New Yorker.

Plot summary
The story takes place in New York City over the course of the hot summer of 1945.

Grady McNeil, a 17-year-old upper class Protestant débutante, steadfastly refuses to accompany her parents on their usual summer ritual of travel, in this case to France. Left in the city for the summer by herself, she pursues a covert romance with Clyde Manzer, a Jewish parking lot attendant, whom she had noticed several months earlier.  Grady spends time with Clyde and meets some of his friends, and in turn the couple visits the Central Park Zoo together. There, Clyde mentions his brother's bar mitzvah as a way of introducing the fact that he is Jewish.

As the summer heats up, so does Grady's and Clyde's romance.  The couple is soon wed in Red Bank, New Jersey. Once married, Grady meets Clyde's middle-class family in Brooklyn, and only then is the couple truly faced with the stark reality of the cultural divide between her family and his. Grady then realizes at her sister Apple's home that she is six weeks pregnant.

Grady has passed over a couple of opportunities to spend time with the handsome young Peter Bell, a man of her social stature who is romantically interested in her.  Eventually Grady's sister, Apple, confronts her about her relationship with Clyde.  In an abrupt ending, Grady aims her speeding Buick with passengers Peter, Clyde, and Clyde's friend Gump so it will crash off the Queensboro Bridge, killing everyone.

Film adaptation
A film adaptation of Summer Crossing was confirmed in November 2011. Playwrights Tristine Skyler and T. Rafael Cimino – along with Scarlett Johansson – wrote the screenplay and Johansson was slated to direct, marking her feature film directorial debut. As of 2023, the novel has not been adapted yet.

References
Notes

Bibliography

2005 American novels
Novels by Truman Capote
Novels published posthumously
Novels set in New York City
Fiction set in 1945
Random House books